
NVC community H5 (Erica vagans - Schoenus nigricans heath) is one of the heath communities in the British National Vegetation Classification system. It is one of three communities which are considered transitional between the lowland dry heaths and the wetter communities classified in the NVC as mires.

It is a very localised community. There are two subcommunities.

Community composition

The following constant species are found in this community:
 Bog pimpernel (Anagallis tenella)
 Flea Sedge (Carex pulicaris)
 Cross-leaved Heath (Erica tetralix)
 Cornish Heath (Erica vagans)
 Sheep's Fescue (Festuca ovina)
 Purple Moor-grass (Molinia caerulea)
 Tormentil (Potentilla erecta)
 Black Bog-rush (Schoenus nigricans)
 Saw-wort (Serratula tinctoria)
 Devil's-bit Scabious (Succisa pratensis)
 Western Gorse (Ulex gallii)
 Yellow Starry Feather-moss (Campylium stellatum)

The following rare species are associated with the community:
 Bristle Bent (Agrostis curtisii)
 Cornish Heath (Erica vagans)
 Spring Squill (Scilla verna)

Distribution

This community is confined to The Lizard peninsula in Cornwall.

Subcommunities

There are two subcommunities:
 the so-called typical subcommunity
 the Eriocharis multicaulis subcommunity

References

 Rodwell, J. S. (1991) British Plant Communities Volume 2 - Mires and heaths  (hardback),  (paperback)

H05